Kluttz is a surname. Notable people with the surname include:

Clyde Kluttz (1917–1979), American baseball player
Lonnie Kluttz (born 1945), American basketball player
Susan W. Kluttz, American politician 
Theodore F. Kluttz (1848–1918), American politician
Tyler Kluttz, ring name Brad Maddox, (born 1984), American wrestler

See also 
Barber & Kluttz, was an architectural firm that produced pattern books used across the United States
Klutz (disambiguation)